Charles Berry Parsons (24 August 1903 – 12 July 1965) was an Australian rules footballer who played with Carlton in the Victorian Football League (VFL).

Family
The son of Edward Charles Parsons (1870–1938), and Clarissa Helen Wright (1871–1946), née Wright, Charles Berry Parsons was born at Numurkah, Victoria on 24 August 1903.

He married Maude Florence Lydia Bartell (1910–1997) at Perth on 5 October 1935.

Football
Renowned for his skill and his scrupulous fairness, he played at the highest level of Australian Rules football in three States — with Carlton in the VFL, with Sturt in the SANFL, and with Claremont in the WANFL — and, also, represented both the VFL and the SANFL in representative matches.

Military service
He enlisted in the Second AIF in 1940, and had reached the rank of Lieutenant at the time of his discharge in 1945.

Death
He died (suddenly) at his home at Warracknabeal, Victoria on 12 July 1965.

Notes

References
 
 To Play for Carlton, The Weekly Times, (Saturday, 6 April 1929), p.70.
 Famous Player to Coach Warracknabeal, The Horsham Times, ((Friday, 26 April 1946), p.8.
 [https://nominal-rolls.dva.gov.au/veteran?id=436619&c=WW2 World War Two Nominal Roll: Lieutenant Charles Berry Parsons (VX24730), Department of Veterans' Affairs.]
 B883, VX24730: World War Two Service Record: Lieutenant Charles Berry Parsons (VX24730), National Archives of Australia''.

External links 

 
Charlie Parsons's profile at Blueseum

1903 births
1965 deaths
Carlton Football Club players
Australian rules footballers from Victoria (Australia)
Sturt Football Club players
Claremont Football Club players
Australian Army personnel of World War II
Australian Army officers